Jiang Chao (born 12 August 1991), also known as Jo Jiang, is a Chinese actor and singer. He graduated in Beijing Contemporary Music Academy, and was the Jinan region's champion in the singing contest Super Boy (2010). He is noted for his role as Xi Cheng in the Tiny Times film series and as Gu Cheng Ze in the romantic comedy series The Fox's Summer.

Filmography

Film

Television series

Discography

Awards and nominations

References

External links 
Jiang Chao on Weibo

21st-century Chinese male actors
Living people
Chinese male film actors
1991 births
Male actors from Anhui
Singers from Anhui
Super Boy contestants
Chinese male television actors